Protein FAM136A is a protein that in humans is encoded by the FAM136A gene.

Clinical significance 
Mutations in FAM136A are associated to Ménière's disease.

References

Further reading